Mount Hood is an 1869 painting by Albert Bierstadt, and part of the collection of the Portland Art Museum in Portland, Oregon, in the United States. It portrays a view of the mountain in Oregon with the same name.

To Bierstadt, communicating the metaphor of the monumentality of the American West was more important than making the painting geographically accurate. As a result, many features of the painting were modified from the real landscape, such as the exaggerated height Mount Hood and different landscape components that could not all be viewed at the same time in a single place along the Columbia River Gorge. An example of this is that the view of the mountain face seen in the picture is as it would be seen from Portland, but the landscape is painted as if the viewer was looking from Multnomah Falls and the northern shore of the Columbia River.

References

1869 paintings
Collection of the Portland Art Museum
Paintings by Albert Bierstadt
Mount Hood